Aleksei Aleksandrovich Nikitenkov (born 6 January 2001) is a Russian football player who plays for FC Veles Moscow on loan from PFC Krylia Sovetov Samara.

Club career
He made his debut in the Russian Professional Football League for FC Chertanovo Moscow on 20 May 2018 in a game against FC Murom. He made his Russian Football National League debut for Chertanovo on 1 September 2018 in a game against FC Tyumen.

On 5 February 2022, Nikitenkov moved to Krylia Sovetov Samara. On 17 February 2022, Nikitenkov was loaned by FC Metallurg Lipetsk. On 20 January 2023, he moved on loan to FC Veles Moscow.

References

External links
 
 Profile by Russian Professional Football League

2001 births
Sportspeople from Tolyatti
Living people
Russian footballers
Russia youth international footballers
Association football defenders
FC Chertanovo Moscow players
FC Olimp-Dolgoprudny players
PFC Krylia Sovetov Samara players
FC Metallurg Lipetsk players
FC Veles Moscow players
Russian First League players
Russian Second League players